A Hole in the Forehead (also known as A Hole Between the Eyes) is a 1968 Italian Spaghetti Western film directed by Giuseppe Vari.

Cast 
 
 Dragomir Bojanić as Billy Blood (credited as Anthony Ghidra)
 Robert Hundar as General Munguja 
 Rosy Zichel as Adelita 
 Corinne Fontaine as Placida 
 Giuseppe Addobbati as Prior Blasco
 Jhon Bryan as Miguel

References

External links
 

Spaghetti Western films
1968 Western (genre) films
1968 films
Films directed by Giuseppe Vari
Films scored by Roberto Pregadio
1960s Italian-language films
1960s Italian films